Constantine Diogenes (died 1073) was one of the sons of Byzantine Emperor Romanos IV Diogenes (reigned 1068–1071).

He was a son of Romanos with his unnamed first wife, a daughter of Alusian, and hence excluded from the line of succession when his father married the empress-dowager Eudokia Makrembolitissa in 1068. He was named after his grandfather, general Constantine Diogenes (died 1032).

The then kouropalatissa Anna Dalassene (later, regent of the empire), wife of the brother of the late Emperor Isaac I Komnenos, despised the Doukas imperial family. According to perceptions of Anna Dalassene, the Doukas men had usurped the imperial dignity by tricking emperor Isaac into resigning and her husband, the kouropalates John Komnenos, into refusing the throne. Anna Dalassene expected the Doukas men to lead the country to military problems. Consequently, Anna Dalassene plotted with Romanos Diogenes and others to push the underage Michael VII Doukas aside. Romanos Diogenes was raised to the imperial throne, having to marry the Doukas dowager empress Eudokia Makrembolitissa. As a signal of strength of the allied supporters and Romanos IV, the marriage of Constantine Diogenes was arranged. Emperor Romanos' son received the daughter of kouropalates John Komnenos and kouropalatissa Anna Dalassene as his bride. The marriage was one of signals of the anti-Doukas camp. He was married to Theodora Komnene, sister of the later emperor Alexios I Komnenos (reigned 1081–1118), some time during his father's reign. Their daughter Anna Diogenissa became the consort of Serbia after her marriage to Uroš I of Serbia.

Constantine fell in battle in 1073. An adventurer pretended to be him in the 1090s, and invaded the Byzantine Empire with Cuman help in 1095.

References

Sources
 
 
 

1073 deaths
11th-century Byzantine people
Diogenes family
Komnenos dynasty
Year of birth unknown
Byzantines killed in battle
11th-century births
Sons of Byzantine emperors